D'Jamin Bartlett (also credited as D. Jamin-Bartlett; born Doris Jamin on May 21, 1948, New York City) is an American musical theatre actress.

She trained for the stage at the American Academy of Dramatic Arts. Bartlett made her first professional stage appearance in 1971 at Ford's Theatre in Washington, D.C. in a production of Godspell. While performing in Godspell, Bartlett was invited to audition for A Little Night Music by the office of Harold Prince. She flew to Boston to sing an audition piece for Stephen Sondheim and Prince. They gave her the role of Petra, replacing another actress who had been having trouble with "The Miller's Son", Petra's musical number in the show.

A Little Night Music premiered in Boston, Massachusetts before transferring to the Shubert Theatre on Broadway. Bartlett made her Broadway debut with the show on February 25, 1973.

During this Broadway run, Bartlett appeared on The Tonight Show Starring Johnny Carson on 10 May 1973. Bartlett's performance in A Little Night Music earned her the 1974 Drama Desk Award for Most Promising Performer.

After A Little Night Music, Bartlett's only other Broadway performance came in the 1975 production of Boccaccio at the Edison Theatre. Other venues at which Bartlett has performed include the Studio Arena Theater in 1974, The Village Gate in 1976, the National Theatre in 1978, and the Pittsburgh Civic Light Opera in 1979. She has also toured in the roles of Eliza in My Fair Lady and Fastrada in Pippin.

Family
Bartlett's daughters are actress Alison Bartlett-O'Reilly and Holley Anne Bartlett-LaSala.

References 

American Academy of Dramatic Arts alumni
American musical theatre actresses
Actresses from New York City
1948 births
Living people
Drama Desk Award winners
People from New York City
21st-century American women